The fourth Commonwealth Paraplegic Games were held in  Dunedin, New Zealand from 13 to 19 January 1974. The Games were opened by Sir Denis Blundell, Governor-General of New Zealand.

Participating nations 

The competing countries and competitors were:

 

 

Three New Zealand based competitors competed by special invitation of the organising committee – T. Cullen, R. Porter and P. Read.

Sports 

The following sports were included in the Games:
 
 Archery
 Athletics
 Dartchery
 Lawn Bowls
 Pentathlon (Archery, Athletics and Swimming Events)
 Shooting
 Snooker
 Swimming
 Table tennis
 Weightlifting (Men Only)
 Wheelchair Basketball (Men Only)
 Wheelchair Fencing

Venues 

The following were the venues used for the Games:

The Games 

Australia's Gwen Milburn won gold in the women's 60 m track athletics event.  Australia also picked up medals in the bowls event.

The Outstanding Performers in Dunedin

The most successful athlete in Dunedin amongst the men was P. Reid from Jamaica who won 4 gold and 1 silver medal in field events, pentathlon and swimming. Amongst the women the most successful athlete was Caz Bryant from England who won 5 gold, 1 silver and 1 bronze medal in fencing, field events, pentathlon, table tennis and track events.

Medal table

See also 

Commonwealth Games hosted in New Zealand
 1950 Commonwealth Games in Auckland
 1974 Commonwealth Games in Christchurch
 1990 Commonwealth Games in Auckland

References 

New Zealand and the Commonwealth of Nations
Commonwealth Paraplegic Games
1974 British Commonwealth Games
Commonwealth Paraplegic Games
Commonwealth Paraplegic Games
Sports competitions in Dunedin
1970s in Dunedin
January 1974 sports events in New Zealand